Olav Lofthus (8 October 1847 – 10  August 1894) was a Norwegian journalist and newspaper editor.

He was born at Ullensvang, in Hordaland, Norway. He was a student at Voss in 1861-62 and took teacher training at Stord Seminar in 1866-68. Lofthus practiced as a teacher in Vik for three years and one year in Ullensvang in the period 1862-1866. Lofthus was chief editor of the newspaper Bergens Tidende from 1872 to 1894. His collection  was published after his death.

He was married to Valborg Henriette Wallem (1851–1929) and was the father of painter Arne Lofthus.

References

1847 births
1894 deaths
People from Ullensvang
Norwegian newspaper editors
Bergens Tidende editors